Émile Chautard (7 September 1864 – 24 April 1934) was a French-American film director, actor, and screenwriter, most active in the silent era. He directed more than 100 films between 1910 and 1924.  He also appeared in more than 60 films between 1911 and 1934.

Life and work
Chautard was born in Paris. After a significant career beginning as a stage actor at the Odéon-Théâtre de l'Europe and moving up to the head of film production at Éclair Films' Paris studio in 1913, Chautard emigrated to the United States in January 1915, sailing on the S/S Rochambeau, from Le Havre to New York. From 1915 to about 1918, Chautard worked for the World Film Company based in Fort Lee, New Jersey.

At World, along with a group of other French-speaking film technicians including Maurice Tourneur, Léonce Perret, George Archainbaud, Albert Capellani and Lucien Andriot, he developed such films as the 1915 version of Camille, and taught a young apprentice film cutter at the World studio: Josef von Sternberg. In 1919 Chautard hired von Sternberg as his assistant director for The Mystery of the Yellow Room, for his own short-lived production company.

Choosing Hollywood over a return to France, Chautard went to work for Famous Players-Lasky and other studios.  He received some high-profile assignments, for instance a Colleen Moore vehicle and two features for Derelys Perdue, but he was a generation older than other directors in Hollywood's French colony. After 1924 Chautard did not direct again, but continued to make film appearances, in the von Sternberg film Blonde Venus (1932), where he appears for his former protege as "Night club owner Chautard".

Chautard died in Los Angeles, California. He is interred at the Hollywood Forever Cemetery.

Selected filmography

 Protéa (1913) - Ministre de CEltie
 The Eaglet (1913) - Napoleon Bonaparte
 The Rack (1915, director)
 The Boss (1915, director)
 Human Driftwood (1916, director)
 The Family Honor (1917, director)
 The Fires of Youth (1917, director)
 Magda (1917, director, lost)
 A Girl's Folly (1917) - Actor (uncredited)
 The Eternal Temptress (1917, director)
 The Marionettes (1918, director)
 The House of Glass (1918, director)
 The Ordeal of Rosetta (1918, director)
 Under the Greenwood Tree (1918, director)
 The Marionettes (1918, director)
 Eyes of the Soul (1919, director)
 The Marriage Price (1919, director)
 The Mystery of the Yellow Room (1919, director, based on a Gaston Leroux story)
 The Black Panther's Cub (1921, director)
 Whispering Shadows (1921, director)
 Forsaking All Others (1922, director)
 Youth to Youth (1922, director)
 The Glory of Clementina (1922, director)
 Daytime Wives (1923, director)
 Untamed Youth (1924, director)
 Paris at Midnight (1926) - Père Goriot
 Broken Hearts of Hollywood (1926) - Director
 Bardelys the Magnificent (1926) - Anatol
 My Official Wife (1926) - Count Orloff, Hélène's Father
 Upstage (1926) - Performer (uncredited)
 The Flaming Forest (1926) - André Audemard
 Blonde or Brunette (1927) - Father-in-Law
 Upstream (1927) - Campbell-Mandare
 Whispering Sage (1927) - José Arastrade
 Seventh Heaven (1927) - Father Chevillon, the Priest
 Now We're in the Air (1927) - Monsieur Chelaine
 The Love Mart (1927) - Louis Frobelle
 The Noose (1928) - Priest
 His Tiger Lady (1928) - Stage Manager
 The Olympic Hero (1928) - Grandpa Brown
 Lilac Time (1928) - The Mayor
 Out of the Ruins (1928) - Père Gilbert
 Caught in the Fog (1928) - The Old Man
 Adoration (1928) - Murajev
 House of Horror (1929) - Old Miser
 Marianne (1929, silent and musical versions) - Père Joseph
 Times Square (1929) - David Lederwitski
 South Sea Rose (1929) - Rosalie's Uncle
 Tiger Rose (1929) - Frenchman (uncredited)
 Free and Easy (1930) - Minor Role (uncredited)
 Le spectre vert (1930) - Abdoul
 Sweeping Against the Winds (1930)
 Estrellados (1930)
 A Man from Wyoming (1930) - French Mayor
 Mysterious Mr. Parkes (1930) - Sylvester Corbett
 Just Like Heaven (1930) - Jacques Dulac
 Morocco (1930) - French General (uncredited)
 Counter Investigation (1930) - O'Brien
 Échec au roi (1930) - Le roi Eric VIII - The King
 The Little Cafe (1931) - Philibert
 The Big Trail (1931) - Padre
 Révolte dans la prison (1931) - Pop
 The Common Law (1931) - Doorman (uncredited)
 The Road to Reno (1931) - Andre
 The Yellow Ticket (1931) - Headwaiter (uncredited)
 Le procès de Mary Dugan (1931)
 Cock of the Air (1932) - French Ambassador
 Shanghai Express (1932) - Major Lenard
 Le fils de l'autre (1932) - John Whitcomb
 The Man from Yesterday (1932) - Priest
 Blonde Venus (1932) - Chautard, French Nightclub Manager (uncredited)
 Le bluffeur (1932) - Oscar Brown
 Rasputin and the Empress (1932) - Minor Role (uncredited)
 The California Trail (1933) - Don Marco Ramirez
 The Three Musketeers (1933, Serial) - Gen. Pelletier [Ch. 1]
 The Devil's in Love (1933) - Father Carmion
 The Solitaire Man (1933) - French Hotel Clerk (uncredited)
 Design for Living (1933) - Train Conductor (uncredited)
 Gallant Lady (1933) - French Hotel Clerk (uncredited)
 The Way to Love (1933) - M. Prias
 Man of Two Worlds (1934) - Natkusiak
 Wonder Bar (1934) - Pierre - the Concierge (uncredited)
 Come On Marines! (1934) - Priest
 Riptide (1934) - Doctor (uncredited)
 Viva Villa! (1934) - General Told to Leave Room (uncredited)

References

External links

1864 births
1934 deaths
French film directors
French male film actors
French male silent film actors
French male screenwriters
20th-century French screenwriters
Actors from Avignon
French emigrants to the United States
20th-century French male actors
Burials at Hollywood Forever Cemetery
20th-century French male writers
Articles containing video clips